Michael A. Chowdry (1954-2001) was a Pakistani-American businessman who became the founder of American-based cargo carrier Atlas Air in 1992. He was on the Forbes 400 list with a net worth of $920 million, ranked among the richest American businessmen of Pakistani heritage before his death in a plane crash in 2001.

Early life and education
Born in Pakistan in a Muslim Punjabi family, Chowdry emigrated to England aged 15. He was a son of Chowdry Ghais Akbar Buttar, a retired army officer and grandson of Chowdry Mohammad Akbar Buttar; a government bureaucrat. In 1976, he moved to the United States where he graduated from the University of Minnesota Crookston in 1978 with a degree in Agricultural Aviation. He started his aviation career flying crop dusters and selling Piper airplanes to cover his college tuition. He gave flying lessons to farmers, and also worked under a government contract flying Native Americans to the Mayo Clinic from reservations in the midwest.

Career
Chowdry expanded his business into buying and selling landing rights at constrained airports in the early 1980s. In 1984, he started a company named Aeronautics Leasing, which leased passenger airplanes to major carriers such as Pan American, British Airways and Trans World Airlines. In 1992, Michael Chowdry founded Atlas Air which is based in Purchase, NY, valued around $ 1.39 billion, operates B747's in 46 countries and 101 cities. By 1993, Atlas Air was flying routes to Taipei and Europe, and the company went public in 1997.

Plane crash
On January 24, 2001, Michael Chowdry died while flying his personal Czech-made Aero L-39 Albatros jet trainer with Jeff Cole, aerospace editor of the Wall Street Journal. The plane crashed in Watkins, Colorado, killing both Chowdry and Cole. He was survived by his wife and four children. His wife Linda in 2021 published the memoir No Man's Son - A Flight from Obscurity to Fame about her late husband.

References

External links 
 Chowdry, Michael on Forbes 400
 Introducing the Michael A. Chowdry $5,000 Entrepreneurial Scholarships
 Californiaaviation.org

1955 births
2001 deaths
American people of Punjabi descent
Aviators killed in aviation accidents or incidents in the United States
Pakistani expatriates in England
Pakistani emigrants to the United States
American transportation businesspeople
University of Minnesota Crookston alumni
American people of Pakistani descent
Accidental deaths in Colorado
American billionaires
Pakistani billionaires
Victims of aviation accidents or incidents in 2001
People from Lahore